There are four groups in the American Zone of the Davis Cup. The two winners of Group I advances to the World Group play-offs while the last placed team will be relegated to Group II the following year. The winner of Group II gets promoted to Group I next year, the two last placed teams get relegated to Group III. The top two teams of Group III gets promoted to Group II while the two weakest teams gets relegated to Group IV. In Group IV no team can get relegated, the best two will get promoted to Group III.

Group I

Group II

Group III

 
 
 
  – promoted to Group II in 2013
  – promoted to Group II in 2013

External links
Official Site

 
Americas Zone
Davis Cup Americas Zone